The 1992 Frankfurt Galaxy season was the second season for the team in the World League of American Football (WLAF). The team was led by head coach Jack Elway in his second year, and played its home games at Waldstadion in Frankfurt, Germany. They finished the season in second place of the European Division with a record of three wins and seven losses.

Offseason

World League draft

Personnel

Staff

Roster

Schedule

Standings

Game summaries

Week 1: at Barcelona Dragons

Week 2: at London Monarchs

Week 3: vs Birmingham Fire

Week 4: vs Barcelona Dragons

Week 5: at New York/New Jersey Knights

Week 6: vs Orlando Thunder

Week 7: at Ohio Glory

Week 8: at Sacramento Surge

Week 9: vs San Antonio Riders

Week 10: vs London Monarchs

References

Frankfurt Galaxy seasons